Sadie Pack may refer to:

 Sadie Grant Pack, a Christian Scientist
 Sarah Martha "Sadie" Emison Pack, namesake of Sadieville, Kentucky